This is a 2022 timeline of events in the Somali Civil War (2009–present).

January–March 
 19 February: An al-Shabaab suicide bomber kills 14 people at a restaurant in Beledweyne.
 23 March: Al-Shabaab jihadists carry out a series of four coordinated attacks in Mogadishu and Beledweyne, killing at least 60 people.

April–June 
 22 April: An al-Shabaab suicide bomber kills six people at a seafood restaurant frequented by politicians in Lido Beach, Mogadishu.

July–September 
 20–25 July: Hundreds of al-Shabaab insurgents invade Ethiopia, advancing up to  into Ethiopian territory before being defeated.
 19–21 August: Al-Shabaab suicide bombers and gunmen attack a hotel in Mogadishu, killing 21 people and taking hostages.

October–December 
 3 October: October 2022 Beledweyne bombings
 23 October: 2022 Kismayo hotel attack
 29 October: October 2022 Mogadishu bombings: a twin car bombing in Mogadishu by al-Shabaab kills 121 people.
 27 November - November 2022 Mogadishu attack
 5 December: Somali forces and allied militias seized Adan Yabal from Al-Shabaab.

References 

2022 in Somalia
Lists of armed conflicts in 2022
2022